Shahinaz is a given name. Notable people with the name include:

 Shahinaz Gadalla, physician-scientist and cancer epidemiologist 
 Shahinaz Gawish, Egyptian television presenter

Egyptian feminine given names